Craig James Smith (born 30 August 1978) is a Scottish professional rugby union player, currently in the French second-level Rugby Pro D2. club Narbonne. Previously, he had spent nine seasons in Scotland with Edinburgh Rugby and also played for Racing Métro.

Career 
Craig Smith played in all three Test matches on Scotland's 2004 summer tour to Australia, all three autumn Test games in 2005, and came on as a replacement in every Scotland game in the 2006 RBS Six Nations Championship.

Previously, he played in both Test matches on Scotland's 2002 tour of North America. Before the tour he had played at loose-head prop in the non-cap match against the Barbarians, but he lined up on the right of the scrum when he started matches on the tour. He first appeared for the Scottish national side as a substitute in the non-cap game against the Barbarians in May 2001.

He won his first Scotland A cap during the 2000–01 season against Italy and has played 10 times at that level. He also played for the Stoke club in New Zealand's South Island and was selected for Nelson Bays against Scotland during the national team's 2000 summer tour. On his return to Scotland in 2000 he was contracted by Edinburgh. Craig has represented Scotland at all age-grade levels and was in the Scotland under-19 squad who beat England in 1997. The former pupil of Berwick County High School has also played for Scottish Students, Scotland Development XV and the Scottish Co-optimists. Before a stint with Melrose RFC, Craig played his club rugby at Berwick RFC.

External links 
 Sporting Heroes profile
 Edinburgh Rugby

1978 births
Living people
Rugby union players from York
Scottish rugby union players
Scotland international rugby union players
Rugby union props
Berwick RFC players
Melrose RFC players
Racing 92 players
Nelson Bays rugby union players